Sangdil is a 1952 Indian Hindi-language romantic drama film directed by R. C. Talwar. The film is an adaptation of the 1847 Charlotte Brontë classic novel Jane Eyre and it stars Dilip Kumar, Madhubala in lead roles. The film's music is by Sajjad Hussain and film song lyrics by Rajinder Krishan.

Sangdil was the second film after Ram Daryani's Tarana (1951) to star Dilip Kumar and Madhubala together. The film was theatrically released on 28 November 1952 and emerged as a commercial success.

Plot
Shankar (Dilip Kumar) and Kamla (Madhubala) are childhood sweethearts who are unfortunately separated at a young age. They meet years later and rekindle their romance, but Shankar has a lot of dark secrets. When they are about to be married, a man shows up and confronts Shankar about his "wife", and asks him how he can marry again and cheat his first "wife".

It is then revealed that Shankar's mother, in a bout of greed, tricked him into "marrying" a mentally challenged rich woman. The insane woman is kept locked up in a dungeon. Kamla is hurt that Shankar hid all this from her and goes back to her village, despite Shankar's desperate pleas for her to stay with him. The lovers are heartbroken without each other.

Finally, when she returns to Shankar, Kamla finds out that his entire mansion was accidentally burned by the insane woman, who herself was a victim in the fire accident. She goes in search of Shankar, but realises that he was blinded in the fire. However, they declare their love for each other and are happily united.

Cast 
Dilip Kumar as Shankar
Madhubala as Kamla
Shammi as Mohini
Leela Chitnis as Dhaai Maa
Pratima Devi as Badi Maa
Dara Singh

Soundtrack 
The music of the film was composed by music director [[Sajjad Hussain (composer)|Sajjad Hussain]] and lyrics were penned by Rajinder Krishan.

Reception

Critical reception 
Baburao Patel, the editor of Filmindia magazine, called Sangdil "a dull, boring and stupid picture". He, however, praised Dilip Kumar's acting skills.

Box office 
Despite mixed reviews, Sangdil emerged as the seventh highest-grossing film of 1952. It grossed ₹0.95 crore at the box office, including a nett of ₹0.5 crore. Box Office India declared it a commercial success.

Sources

References

External links 
 

1952 films
1950s Hindi-language films
Films scored by Sajjad Hussain
Films based on Jane Eyre
Indian black-and-white films
Films based on works by Charlotte Brontë